Mark Fraser may refer to:

 Mark Fraser (footballer, born 1971), Australian rules footballer and umpire
 Mark Fraser (footballer, born 1959), Australian rules footballer for South Melbourne
 Mark Fraser (ice hockey) (born 1986), Canadian ice hockey player
 Mark Fraser (secretary), Australian general secretary